Electrick Children is a 2012 American independent coming of age film  written and directed by Rebecca Thomas and starring Julia Garner, Rory Culkin, and Liam Aiken. Garner plays Rachel, a 15-year-old girl from a fundamentalist Mormon community in Utah. After learning that she is pregnant, she believes she has conceived miraculously through listening to a song on a cassette tape.

In writing the script, Thomas drew inspiration from the story of the Virgin Mary, her research on fundamentalist Mormon communities, and her own upbringing. She originally intended to produce the film on a $25,000-budget and hire her family and friends to work on the cast and crew, but when the budget was raised to $1million she was able to hire professional actors. Filming took place over 25 days in Utah and Nevada in late 2011.

Electrick Children premiered at the Berlin International Film Festival on February 10, 2012, and was released in the United States on March 8, 2013. It received mostly positive reviews from critics and Thomas and Garner received several accolades for their work on the film.

Plot 

After her fifteenth birthday, Rachel McKnight, a member of a fundamentalist Mormon community in Utah, listens to a cassette recorder for the first time and hears a cover of "Hanging on the Telephone" by an obscure rock band on a blue cassette. Her brother, Mr. Will, takes it from her, stating that it is to be used only for God's purposes. When she discovers she is pregnant, she is convinced that she has conceived miraculously, like the Virgin Mary, through the medium of the cassette. After being questioned by her parents, Mr. Will is blamed for impregnating her, and is asked to leave the community, while Rachel is told she will be married the next day. Rather than undergo a shotgun marriage arranged by her father, Paul, she escapes to Las Vegas, along with Mr. Will, who is sleeping in the bed of the family's pickup truck.

In Las Vegas Rachel falls in with a group of skaters who live together and play in a band, after becoming intrigued by one of the boys who wears a shirt with a cassette on it. Mr. Will finds her and pleads with her to confess to having sex with someone else so that he can return to their community. Rachel becomes romantically involved with Clyde, one of the skaters, and one night he offers to marry her, saying that together they can look for the man on the tape, who Rachel thinks is the father of her child. When Clyde and Rachel break into his parents' house looking for food and money, Clyde's father calls the police and Mr. Will is arrested while Rachel flees. Remembering one of her mother's bedtime stories, she impulsively follows a red Mustang and discovers that its owner, Tim, is the man who recorded the tape, and is, in fact, her biological father.

Finally, Rachel decides to return to her community. Mr. Will is bailed out of jail by Tim, who is looking for Rachel. Together, he and Mr. Will drive out to the community, and on the way they discover Clyde, whose van has broken down on the highway. As Rachel is about to be wed, Tim, Mr. Will, and Clyde pull up in front of the church in the red Mustang and rescue her. Mr. Will returns to the community and is accepted back with a confession that Rachel has recorded on the blue cassette, although she still firmly believes that God has fathered her child. Some months later, Clyde and a visibly pregnant Rachel are living in a tent by the beach and hold hands as they walk through the waves.

Cast 

 Julia Garner as Rachel McKnight
 Rory Culkin as Clyde
 Liam Aiken as Mr. Will
 Bill Sage as Tim
 Cynthia Watros as Gay Lynn
 Billy Zane as Paul

Production 

Director Rebecca Thomas was raised as a Mormon. She first researched Mormon fundamentalism for a documentary, and the religious group portrayed in Electrick Children is based on this research. She wanted to write a film based on scripture and decided to adapt the story of the Virgin Mary. In writing the script, she drew from her own experience of growing up in Las Vegas and the conflict she perceived "between the traditions of Mormon culture in Utah and the bright lights of Las Vegas". She was also inspired by Pier Paolo Pasolini's "nonjudgmental approach" to religion in The Gospel According to St. Matthew. Thomas began writing the script in April 2011, after her second year of studying at the Columbia University School of the Arts.

Thomas and producer Jessica Caldwell, also a Columbia student, originally intended to make the film on a "microbudget" of $25,000. To raise funds, they created a Kickstarter project which Caldwell showed to another producer, Richard Neustadter, who donated $5000. After reading the script, he contacted Thomas and asked if he could help to produce the film with a larger budget. Thomas agreed and Neustadter went on to raise $1million for the film's production. Thomas had initially planned to recruit her friends and family to work on the film's cast and crew, but the larger budget allowed her to hire professional actors. She hired several of her Columbia classmates to work on film's crew.

Julia Garner was cast less than a week before filming began. Another actor, Peter Vack, had recommended her to Thomas, who said that Garner "was one of the only actresses I found who looked young enough, but also had a mature emotional depth". Electrick Children marked Garner's first lead role in a film, and Thomas thought that her inexperience in acting made her "very teen-like". Thomas sought out Rory Culkin to play Clyde, while Billy Zane was cast on the recommendation of the casting director, who was a friend of Zane.

The film was shot over 25 days in September–October 2011. The first part of production took place in Utah, where filming locations included Hurricane and the ghost town of Grafton, Utah. The latter half of filming was completed in Nevada, with locations including Las Vegas and Indian Springs, Nevada. An additional scene was also shot at San Onofre State Beach in California.

Release 

Electrick Children had its world premiere at the Berlin International Film Festival on February 10, 2012. It was screened at the South by Southwest Film Festival on March 15, 2012, and went on to be shown at the Buenos Aires International Festival of Independent Cinema, the Deauville American Film Festival, the Miskolc International Film Festival, the Mumbai Film Festival, the Woodstock Film Festival, the BUSTER Copenhagen International Film Festival for Children and Youth, the Camerimage Film Festival, the Palm Springs International Film Festival, and the Tallinn Black Nights Film Festival.

The film was distributed by Phase 4 Films in the United States. It was given a "day-and-date release" on March 8, 2013, meaning that it was released simultaneously in theaters and on video on demand. It was also released theatrically in the United Kingdom, Russia, New Zealand, France, Brazil, and Spain, grossing a total of $137,126 outside of the U.S.

Reception 

The film received an 86% "fresh" rating on Rotten Tomatoes, with 19 "fresh" reviews out of a total of 22 and an average rating of 6.2/10. The site's critical consensus states, "A strong directorial debut for Rebecca Thomas, Electrick Children also features an outstanding performance from Julia Garner as a wild teenager from a conservative family." The film has a score of 60 on Metacritic, based on nine reviews—two positive and seven mixed.

The New York Times film critic Stephen Holden described Electrick Children as "neither comedy nor drama nor satire but a surreal mélange infused with magical realism". He criticised its lack of narrative continuity but said "the movie's underlying sweetness leaves a residual glow" and praised Garner's "radiant performance". Catherine Shoard of The Guardian awarded the film 3 out of 5 stars, describing it as overly quirky but "so deftly done it's three parts enchantment to one part irritation". She called Garner's performance "magnetic", and thought that the religious community was convincingly portrayed.  Variety magazine's Leslie Felperin called the film "a sweet slice of indie quirk", and praised the direction and acting despite feeling that the script had been "overworked". Writing for The Hollywood Reporter, Justin Lowe highlighted Thomas's direction, Mattias Troelstrup's cinematography, and the performance of Garner, whom he described as "a revelation". Chuck Bowen of Slant Magazine described Thomas as "an exceptional stylist", commending her for avoiding clichés, and wrote that "Electrick Children is one of the most sensible and humane explorations of youthful curiosity and alienation I've seen in some time." The Los Angeles Times Gary Goldstein, however, found the film to be "unevenly told and at times too fanciful for its own good".

Awards and nominations 

Electrick Children gained Thomas—at that time a fourth-year student at Columbia University School of the Arts—a nomination for the "Someone to Watch" award at the 2012 Independent Spirit Awards. It won her the FIPRESCI Award at the 2012 International Festival of Independent Cinema PKO Off Camera in Kraków, Poland, and a "Directors to Watch" award at the Palm Springs International Film Festival. Electrick Children won Best Film at the Tallinn Blacks Night Film Festival and Garner won Best Young Actress at the BUSTER Copenhagen International Film Festival for Children and Youth and Best Actress at the Mumbai Film Festival.

References

External links 

 
 

2012 films
American coming-of-age films
American independent films
Films about Mormonism
Films set in the Las Vegas Valley
Films set in Utah
Magic realism films
Mormon fundamentalism in fiction
2012 directorial debut films
2010s English-language films
2010s American films